The Canton of Sotteville-lès-Rouen-Ouest is a former canton situated in the Seine-Maritime département and in the Haute-Normandie region of northern France. It was disbanded following the French canton reorganisation which came into effect in March 2015. It consisted of part of the commune of Sotteville-lès-Rouen and had a total of 19,790 inhabitants (2012).

Geography 
A light industrial area, situated on the left bank of the Seine immediately next to Rouen.

See also 
 Arrondissements of the Seine-Maritime department
 Cantons of the Seine-Maritime department
 Communes of the Seine-Maritime department

References

Sotteville-les-Rouen-Ouest
2015 disestablishments in France
States and territories disestablished in 2015